Gabriele Paoletti (born 11 April 1978) is a retired Italian football goalkeeper.

Career
In the summer of 2002,  Paoletti was exchanged for Alberto Maria Fontana. In summer 2004, he joined Reggiana in co-ownership deal, for €0.5K.
He also played in the Italian Serie A as backup keeper for Udinese and Messina. In July 2005, he was signed by Udinese to provide extra cover for Morgan De Sanctis. In January 2007, he was signed by Messina as a replacement goalkeeper following the departure of Marco Storari. In the next season, he became backup of Emanuele Manitta.

Following Messina's bankruptcy, he was signed by Arezzo in November 2008.

References

Living people
1978 births
Footballers from Rome
Association football goalkeepers
Italian footballers
Torino F.C. players
Modena F.C. players
L'Aquila Calcio 1927 players
A.C. Reggiana 1919 players
Udinese Calcio players
S.S. Virtus Lanciano 1924 players
A.C.R. Messina players
S.S. Arezzo players
Serie A players